Hilde Glomsås (born 26 April 1978) is a retired Norwegian cross-country skier.

She competed at the 1996, 1997 and 1998 Junior World Championships, winning the gold medal in the 15 km race in 1998.

She made her World Cup debut in the 1997–98 season opener at Beitostølen, finishing 35th. She collected her first World Cup points with a 15th place in the December 1998 Davos 10 km, and improved to a 12th place in January 2000 in Nové Město na Moravě. Her last World Cup outing came in December 2000 in Brusson, where she finished 34th. Her strongest placement came in the 30 km race at the 1999 World Championships, where she finished 7th.

She represented the sports clubs Bærums Verk IF, growing up at Rykkinn.

Cross-country skiing results
All results are sourced from the International Ski Federation (FIS).

World Championships

World Cup

Season standings

Team podiums
2 podiums – (2  )

References 

1978 births
Living people
Sportspeople from Bærum
Norwegian female cross-country skiers